was one of 23 escort destroyers of the Tachibana sub-class of the  built for the Imperial Japanese Navy during the final stages of World War II. Damaged by a naval mine shortly after her completion in June 1945, the ship was surrendered to the Allies at the end of the war and used to repatriate Japanese troops until 1947. Mid-year the destroyer was turned over to the Republic of China; renamed Xin Yang she played a minor role in the Chinese Civil War and remained in service until the 1960s when she was scrapped.

Design and description
The Tachibana sub-class was a simplified version of the preceding  to make them even more suited for mass production. The ships had two Kampon geared steam turbines, each driving one propeller shaft, using steam provided by two Kampon water-tube boilers.

The main armament of the Tachibana sub-class consisted of three Type 89  dual-purpose guns in one twin-gun mount aft and one single mount forward of the superstructure. The single mount was partially protected against spray by a gun shield. The accuracy of the Type 89 guns was severely reduced against aircraft because no high-angle gunnery director was fitted. They carried a total of 25 Type 96  anti-aircraft guns in 4 triple and 13 single mounts. The Tachibanas were equipped with Type 13 early-warning and Type 22 surface-search radars. The ships were also armed with a single rotating quadruple mount amidships for  torpedoes. They could deliver their 60 depth charges via two stern rails and two throwers.

Construction and service 
Hatsuume (early-blooming plum) was ordered in Fiscal Year 1944 under the Wartime Naval Armaments Supplement Program and she was laid down at Maizuru Naval Arsenal on 8 December 1944. The ship was launched on 25 April 1945 and completed on 18 June. The destroyer was assigned to the 11th Destroyer Squadron of the Combined Fleet that same day for working up. Hatsuume was damaged when she struck a naval mine near Maizuru eight days later that killed four crewmen. The unrepaired ship was transferred to the Maizuru Naval District on 15 July.

She was turned over to Allied forces at Maizuru at the time of the surrender of Japan on 2 September and was stricken from the navy list on 5 October. The destroyer was disarmed and used to repatriate Japanese personnel in 1945–1947 after repairs. Hatsuume was turned over to the Republic of China on 6 July of the latter year and was renamed Xin Yang. Six years later the ship was refitted using components from her sister  and rearmed with American weapons: two single mounts for  dual-purpose guns and an anti-aircraft suite of seven 40 mm Bofors and six 20 mm Oerlikon guns. Xin Yang was stricken from the navy list in December 1961 and subsequently scrapped.

Notes

Bibliography

 
 

Tachibana-class destroyers
Ships built by Maizuru Naval Arsenal
1945 ships
World War II destroyers of Japan
Destroyers of the Republic of China Navy